Michael James Wahle (born March 29, 1977) is a former American football guard who played eleven seasons in the National Football League (NFL).  He played college football at Navy.  He was drafted by the Green Bay Packers in the second round of the 1998 NFL Supplemental Draft.  A Pro Bowl selection in 2005, Wahle also played for the Carolina Panthers and Seattle Seahawks.

Early years
Wahle attended Rim of the World High School (Lake Arrowhead, California) and won four varsity letters in baseball as a pitcher, and three varsity letters each in football and basketball before graduating in 1995.  He played three years at the U. S. Naval Academy before being forced to resign in his senior season after he tested positive for steroids.

Professional career

Green Bay Packers
Wahle played the first seven seasons of his career with the Green Bay Packers from 1998 to 2004.

Carolina Panthers
Wahle signed as a free agent with the Carolina Panthers in 2005 and was selected to the Pro Bowl that season. He was released by the Panthers on February 11, 2008.

Seattle Seahawks
On February 14, 2008, Wahle signed a five-year contract with the Seattle Seahawks. He started 10 games for the Seahawks in 2008 before being placed on injured reserve with a shoulder injury on December 5. The team signed offensive lineman Steve McKinney to take his place on the roster.

Wahle was released after a failed physical on July 31, 2009 and subsequently retired.

Family
Wahle and his wife, Trina, have two children; daughter Teagan and son Maddox. He currently lives in San Diego, California.

References

External links
Green Bay Packers bio
Seattle Seahawks bio

1977 births
Living people
American football offensive tackles
American football offensive guards
Navy Midshipmen football players
Green Bay Packers players
Carolina Panthers players
Seattle Seahawks players
National Conference Pro Bowl players
Players of American football from Portland, Oregon